David Frank Crisafulli (born 14 April 1979) is an Australian politician. He has been a member of the Queensland Legislative Assembly since 2017, representing the Gold Coast-based electorate of Broadwater for the Liberal National Party, unseating incumbent Verity Barton. He was previously member for the North Queensland-based electorate of Mundingburra from 2012 to 2015, and was initially Minister for Local Government, and then Minister for Local Government, Community Recovery and Resilience during the premiership of Campbell Newman, from 2012 to 2015. Since November 2020, he has been leader of the Liberal National Party  and Leader of the Opposition.

Early life
Born and raised in Ingham, Queensland, Crisafulli graduated with a Bachelor of Journalism degree from James Cook University in Townsville in 2000.
 
In 1998, he returned to his home town of Ingham as a cadet reporter at the Herbert River Express. In 2000, Crisafulli moved into television, becoming a journalist with WIN News in Townsville, and was made chief of staff of the Townsville newsroom in 2002. During that time, Crisafulli also worked as a correspondent for The Australian and Sunday Mail newspapers, did weekly work for DMG Regional Radio as a newsreader, and lectured in journalism at James Cook University.

Politics
In 2003, Crisafulli was appointed as a ministerial media advisor to the then Howard Government Minister and Liberal Senator for Queensland, Ian Macdonald. In 2004, Crisafulli successfully ran for what was then the 100% Labor Party-controlled Townsville City Council, on a conservative platform. In 2008, when the Townsville and Thuringowa councils were merged, he made a deal with Les Tyrell, the former Thuringowa mayor, to run in partnership for the mayor and deputy mayor positions on the new council. He was elected as deputy mayor, an office he held until his resignation in 2012 to run for a seat in the Queensland Parliament. During his second term on Council, he became the chairman of the Townsville City Council Planning Committee.

In the 2012 Queensland state election, Crisafulli was elected to the Legislative Assembly of Queensland in the seat of Mundingburra, as a member of the Liberal National party. He was appointed as the Minister for Local Government in the new Newman government. In February 2013, his role was expanded when he became Minister for Local Government, Community Recovery and Resilience. He re-contested Mundingburra at the 2015 Queensland state election but was defeated by the Labor candidate Coralee O'Rourke.

Following his 2015 election loss, Crisafulli and his family relocated to Hope Island on Queensland's Gold Coast. He subsequently ran a small business giving advice about dealing with government and business development opportunities.

In May 2017, he defeated incumbent Broadwater MP Verity Barton for LNP preselection to contest the 2017 election, and subsequently won the Broadwater seat. In December 2017, after the election of Deb Frecklington as Leader of the Opposition, Crisafulli was appointed as the Shadow Minister for Environment, Science and the Great Barrier Reef, and Shadow Minister for Tourism.

On 12 November 2020, Crisafulli became Leader of the Opposition in Queensland, after the Liberal National Party elected him as party leader following the resignation of Deb Frecklington.

References

Australian politicians of Italian descent
Liberal National Party of Queensland politicians
1979 births
Living people
Members of the Queensland Legislative Assembly
21st-century Australian politicians